The 1999 Currie Cup was the 61st season of the Currie Cup, South Africa's premier domestic rugby union competition, since it started in 1889. The competition was known as the Bankfin Currie Cup for sponsorship reasons and was contested from 2 June to 9 September 1999.

Competition rules and information

There were fourteen participating teams in the 1999 Currie Cup. These teams played all the other teams once over the course of the season, either at home or away.

Teams received four points for a win and two points for a draw. Bonus points were awarded to teams that scored four or more tries in a game, as well as to teams that lost a match by seven points or less. Teams were ranked by log points, then points difference (points scored fewer points conceded). The top 4 teams qualified for the title play-offs. In the semi-finals, the team that finished first had home advantage against the team that finished fourth, while the team that finished second had home advantage against the team that finished third. The winners of these semi-finals advanced to the final, at the home venue of the higher-placed team.

Teams

Team Listing

Changes from 1998

There were name changes prior to this season:
  were renamed the 
  were renamed the 
  were renamed the

Log
The final log of the round-robin stage of the 1999 Currie Cup:

Matches

The following matches were played in the 1999 Currie Cup:

Round one

Round two

Round three

Round four

Round Five

Round Six

Round Seven

Round Eight

Round Nine

Round Ten

Round Eleven

Round Twelve

Round Thirteen

Round Fourteen

Semi-finals

Final

Honours

The honour roll for the 1999 Currie Cup was:

Notes

References